Adlwang is a municipality in the district of Steyr-Land in the Austrian state of Upper Austria.

Geography
Adlwang lies south of Bad Hall and west of Steyr. About 16 percent of the municipality is forest, and 74 percent is farmland.

References

Cities and towns in Steyr-Land District